Chester John Straub (born May 12, 1937) is an inactive senior United States circuit judge of the United States Court of Appeals for the Second Circuit headquartered in New York City.

Education and career
Straub was born on May 12, 1937, in Brooklyn, New York City, New York. He received a Bachelor of Arts degree from St. Peter's College in 1958, and his Bachelor of Laws from the University of Virginia School of Law in 1961. Straub served as a First Lieutenant in United States Army Intelligence and Security from 1961 to 1963. In 1963, he began the private practice of law with Willkie Farr & Gallagher, where he became a partner in 1971, and where he remained until his appointment to the federal bench. Straub's private practice was concentrated in litigation, regulatory agencies and governmental affairs.

State legislative service
Straub was a member of the New York State Assembly from 1967 to 1972, sitting in the 177th, 178th and 179th New York State Legislatures; and a member of the New York State Senate from 1973 to 1975, sitting in the 180th and 181st New York State Legislatures.

Federal judicial service
Straub was nominated by President Bill Clinton on February 11, 1998, to a seat on the United States Court of Appeals for the Second Circuit vacated by Judge Joseph M. McLaughlin. He was confirmed by the United States Senate on June 1, 1998, and received commission on June 3, 1998. He assumed senior status on July 16, 2008.

Notable cases
In January 2006, Straub was one of the three judges selected to hear National Abortion Federation v. Gonzales, 437 F.3d 278, one of the cases later folded into and resolved by Gonzales v. Carhart. The Second Circuit thereby became one of three circuits to uphold district court rulings against the constitutionality of the Partial-Birth Abortion Ban Act of 2003. Out of the nine circuit court judges who ruled on this issue, Straub was the only one to dissent, voting to reverse the district court and uphold the Act.

In the 2006 case of MacWade v. Kelly, Straub wrote for a unanimous three-judge panel of the Second Circuit that warrantless, suspicionless police searches of New York City Subway riders in response to terrorism were justified by the "special needs doctrine" and so did not violate the Fourth Amendment to the United States Constitution.

In 2012, Straub dissented in Windsor v. United States, a case in which the United States Court of Appeals for the Second Circuit held in an opinion written by prominent conservative Chief Judge Dennis Jacobs, that Section 3 of the Defense of Marriage Act (DOMA) is unconstitutional. Of the six circuit judges to rule on challenges to DOMA Section 3 brought by married same-sex couples, Straub was the only judge to find the law constitutional. He wrote that DOMA could easily be justified by Congress' "common sense." On June 26, 2013, the United States Supreme Court affirmed that DOMA Section 3 was unconstitutional because there was "strong evidence" that the "essence" of the law was "'a bare congressional desire to harm a politically unpopular group.'"

References

Sources

External links

1937 births
Judges of the United States Court of Appeals for the Second Circuit
Lawyers from New York City
Living people
Democratic Party members of the New York State Assembly
Military personnel from New York City
Democratic Party New York (state) state senators
Politicians from Brooklyn
Saint Peter's University alumni
United States court of appeals judges appointed by Bill Clinton
University of Virginia School of Law alumni
People associated with Willkie Farr & Gallagher
20th-century American judges
21st-century American judges